Allium acutiflorum is a plant species in the amaryllis family native to northwestern Italy (Liguria) and to southeastern France (including Corsica).

Allium acutiflorum has a single spherical bulb. Scape is up to 40 cm tall, round in cross-section. Leaves are linear, tapering toward the tip, up to 15 cm long. Umbel is spherical, with about 40 flowers. Tepals are purple with a darker purple midvein.

References

acutiflorum
Flora of Italy
Flora of France
Flora of Corsica
Plants described in 1809